The eleventh season of CSI: Crime Scene Investigation premiered on CBS on September 23, 2010, and ended May 12, 2011. The season stars Marg Helgenberger and Laurence Fishburne.

Plot 
Langston fights for his life ("Shockwaves") as Catherine meets a man from her past ("Pool Shark"), in the eleventh season of CSI. Willows and her team face both personal and professional demons this season, as they investigate cases including a decapitation ("Blood Moon"), the knife attack of a Vegas icon ("Sqweegel"), a woman with a hoarding condition ("House of Hoarders"), a T-Rex attack ("Cold Blooded"), a human shredding ("Bump & Grind"), a death connected to fracking ("Fracked"), a murder committed by a cat and a parrot ("Wild Life"), a body in a bin ("Man Up"), and the death of an FBI Agent ("418/427"). Meanwhile, Greg tries to romance a burlesque dancer ("A Kiss Before Frying"), Sara comes face-to-face with her mother-in-law ("The Two Mrs. Grissoms"), Ray's wife comes to Vegas ("All That Cremains"), Nick is forced to shoot and kill a suspect ("Targets of Obsession"), Sofia returns to the CSI team ("Father of the Bride"), and Catherine loses control of her team in Los Angeles ("Cello and Goodbye").

Cast

Main

 Laurence Fishburne as Raymond Langston, a CSI Level 2
 Marg Helgenberger as Catherine Willows, a CSI Level 3 Supervisor
 George Eads as Nick Stokes, a CSI Level 3 Assistant Supervisor
 Jorja Fox as Sara Sidle, a CSI Level 3
 Eric Szmanda as Greg Sanders, a CSI Level 3
 Robert David Hall as Al Robbins, the Chief Medical Examiner
 Wallace Langham as David Hodges, a Trace Technician
 David Berman as David Phillips, an Assistant Medical Examiner
 Paul Guilfoyle as Jim Brass, a Homicide Detective Captain

Recurring

 Jon Wellner as Henry Andrews 
 Archie Kao as Archie Johnson 
 Katee Sackhoff as Frankie Reed
 Marc Vann as Conrad Ecklie
 Alex Carter as Lou Vartann 
 Bill Irwin as Nate Haskell

Guest stars 
 Liz Vassey as Wendy Simms
 William Petersen as Gil Grissom
 Melinda Clarke as Heather Kessler
 Louise Lombard as Sofia Curtis
 Elisabeth Harnois as Morgan Brody
 Method Man as Drops
 Ann-Margret as Margot Wilson
 Dita Von Teese as Ellen Whitebridge
 Justin Bieber as Jason McCann

Changes
Liz Vassey departs the cast in episode two of the season, while Jorja Fox rejoins the regular cast in the season premiere. Laurence Fishburne departs at the season's end. Former cast members William Petersen and Louise Lombard guest star. Elisabeth Harnois makes her series debut.

Episodes

U.S. Nielsen Ratings

References

External links
 

11
2010 American television seasons
2011 American television seasons